Les Corts is a station in the Barcelona Metro network, in the Les Corts district of Barcelona, from which it takes its name. It is served by line L3.

The station opened in 1975, along with the other stations of the section of L3 between Zona Universitària and Sants Estació stations. This section was originally operated separately from L3, and known as L3b, until the two sections were joined in 1982.

References

External links

Les Corts at Trenscat.com

Barcelona Metro line 3 stations
Railway stations in Spain opened in 1975
Transport in Les Corts (district)